Forbidden Fruit is a 2009 Finnish drama film directed by Dome Karukoski. The film is about two teenage girls from a Conservative Laestadian community. The girls travel to Helsinki where they meet other people of their age and learn about their lifestyle that differs greatly from the girls' religious way of life.

Cast 
 Marjut Maristo as Raakel
 Amanda Pilke as Maria
 Malla Malmivaara as Eeva
 Joel Mäkinen as Toni
 Jarkko Niemi as Jussi
 Olavi Uusivirta as Johannes
 Timo Tikka as Luukas
 Jani Volanen as Ilari
 Teemu Ojanne as Mäki
 Heikki Nousiainen as Joki
 Tapio Liinoja as Laakso
 Tuija Töyräs as Raakel's mother
 Jouko Puolanto as Raakel's father
 Eeva Putro as Marian

References

External links 
 
 

Films about Christianity
2000s coming-of-age drama films
Films directed by Dome Karukoski
Films set in Helsinki
Films shot in Finland
Finnish drama films
Laestadianism in popular culture
2009 drama films
2009 films